Rhamphicarpa is a genus of flowering plants belonging to the family Orobanchaceae.

Its native range is Tropical and Southern Africa, Madagascar, Turkey to the Caucasus, India, New Guinea to Northern Australia.

Species:

Rhamphicarpa australiensis 
Rhamphicarpa brevipedicellata 
Rhamphicarpa capillacea 
Rhamphicarpa elongata 
Rhamphicarpa fistulosa 
Rhamphicarpa medwedewii

References

Orobanchaceae
Orobanchaceae genera